Summer Hits No. 1 is an album by pop punk band The Queers. It features the then-current lineup doing 14 new recordings of old songs along with one new song. The album features cover art by Takayuki Hashimoto.

Track listing
 "This Place Sucks"
 "Monster Zero"
 "You're Tripping"
 "Kicked Out of the Weblos"
 "Love Love Love"
 "Another Girl"
 "My Old Man's a Fatso"
 "I Wanna Be Happy"
 "Ursula Finally Has Tits"
 "Like a Parasite"
 "Psycho Over You"
 "Punk Rock Girls"
 "Aishiteruyo Kanojo"
 "The Kids Are Alright"
 "Fuck This World"

Personnel
Joe Queer - Vocals, Guitar
Phillip Hill - Bass, Vocals
Dusty Watson - Drums, Vocals

References

The Queers albums
2004 greatest hits albums